Salim bin Ghabaisha (1930 – 2 January 2016) was a bedouin of Al Rashidi branch of Al Kathiri tribe, and a companion of Sir Wilfred Thesiger, who crossed the Rub' al Khali desert twice between 1945 and 1950. Salim bin Ghabaisha was mentioned multiple times by Wilfred Thesiger in his book Arabian Sands which he describes the lifestyle of bedouin Arabs in the Arabian Peninsula.

Bin Ghabaisha was 17 years old when he first crossed the Rub' al Khali desert and became one of the closest companions to  Thesiger. His photographs, taken by Sir Wilfred, have been  displayed in Pitt Rivers Museum, Oxford after Thesiger donated his vast collection of 38,000 negatives to the museum.

Thesiger described Salim bin Ghabaisha in Arabian Sands as one of the most competent of his companions: 'the others tended to rely on his judgment, as I did myself. He was certainly the best rider and the best shot, and always graceful in everything he did. He had a quick smile and a gentle manner, but I already suspected that he could be both reckless and ruthless, and I was not surprised when within two years he had become one of the most daring outlaws on the Trucial Coast with half a dozen blood-feuds on his hands' (1960: 208–9).

Bin Ghabaisha became one of the icons of the pre-oil era in the United Arab Emirates and was subjected to various interviews and Emirati documentaries in his late years to depict his experience as a traveler. He died on 2 January 2016 in Abu Dhabi.

See also
 Wilfred Thesiger
 Arabian Sands

References

Further reading
 Michael Asher, Thesiger- A Biography Penguin 1994 

1930 births
2016 deaths
Bedouins in Asia